Pushkala Gopal MBE is a practitioner of the Bharatanatyam form of Indian classical dance, hailing from London.

Recognition and Awards 
 Appointed a Member of the Order of the British Empire (MBE) in the 2020 Birthday Honours "For services to South Asian Dance"

Personal life 
Gopal was born in Chelmsford, England, the daughter of an army officer, and has lived in Delhi with her husband, an Indian Administrative Service officer.

References

External links 
 Pushkala Gopal: An Indian Dancer in London- video of Gopal speaking

Living people
Members of the Order of the British Empire
Bharatanatyam exponents
Year of birth missing (living people)
20th-century dancers
21st-century dancers
Female dancers
Dance teachers
Indian female dancers